The Euro-Mediterranean Center on Climate Change (CMCC) is an Italian research centre dedicated to climate and climate related research, including climate variability, its causes and consequences, carried out through numerical models ranging from Global Earth System to Regional models within the Euro-Mediterranean area.

History
The centre has been established with initial funding by the Italian Ministry of Education, University and Research (MIUR), the Ministry of the Environment and Protection of Land and Sea (MATT), the Ministry of Agricultural and Forestry Policies (MIPAF) and the Ministry of Finance (MEF), within the Strategic Programme "Sustainable development and climate change" of the 2001 Special Integrative Fund for Research (FISR), aimed at funding specific activities with exclusive strategic relevance, pursuant to the 2001–2003 (also extended to 2005–2007) National Research Programme (PNR). As such, the CMCC fulfils the "creation of an international level centre for research on climate change" with focus on the: "development and in-depth examination of knowledge on climate variability: study of causes and consequences through high resolution simulations".

The CMCC started its operations in mid-2005.

The official opening of CMCC facilities has been put off at the beginning of 2009, coinciding with the "Climate Science in the Mediterranean area" event, which took place in Lecce, on 31 January 2009.

On 10 December 2015 the Center became a Foundation therefore representing CMCC's legal status, its contents, aims and operational modalities.

In June 2018 a new partnership with RFF established the RFF-CMCC European Institute on Economics and the Environment (EIEE), based in Milan.

Organization
The CMCC is a Foundation with its headquarters in Lecce and local units in Bologna, Venice, Capua, Sassari, Viterbo and Milan, to exploit the existing expertise of its partners.

The legal address of CMCC is: (CMCC) Centro Euro-Mediterraneo per i Cambiamenti Climatici – via Marco Biagi 5 - 73100 Lecce, Italy

The Director of CMCC is Dr. Antonio Navarra.

Partners and associated centres

Partners
Istituto Nazionale di Geofisica e Vulcanologia (INGV)
Università degli Studi del Salento
Centro Italiano Ricerche Aerospaziali (CIRA)
Università Ca' Foscari Venezia
Università di Sassari
Università della Tuscia
Politecnico di Milano
Università di Bologna

Associated centres
Consiglio Nazionale delle Ricerche (CNR) – Dipartimento Ambiente
Istituto Agronomico Mediterraneo di Bari
Centro di Ricerca in Matematica Pura e Applicata – CRMPA

Mission
The mission of the CMCC is "to improve our understanding of the nature and mechanisms of climate variability, its causes and its impacts, with a special emphasis on the Mediterranean area" and its interactions with the global climate. 
Through the capabilities of its members and associate centres, the CMCC delivers scientific-technical products and technical support to Ministries, Regions and Provinces and the private sector in fields such as: 
climate change assessments;
the protection of the marine environment of the Mediterranean Sea towards a sustainable use of the resources;
ecology, forestry science, health and economy;
risk management (natural hazards related to climate, oil spills, coastal euthrophication, water resources, etc.); 
transportation, agriculture, energy and tourism.

Furthermore, through satellite remote sensing, the CMCC also aims to carry out: 
the monitoring of the eco-environmental resources (water, agriculture, forestry);
the analysis and prevention of the risks due to natural and anthropogenic hazards;
the monitoring of the energy and transportation networks.

International cooperation is an essential activity of the CMCC, which financially supports several international projects, and participate to European projects and works within bilateral agreements between Italy and other Countries. Other than operating research coordination/management of international projects led by Italian Ministries, the CMCC also provides scientific support for several multilateral international activities, including IPCC, UNCCD, UNEP and UNFCCC.

In 2008–2009, CMCC also supports the Italian G8 Presidency with scientific and technical advice, including for the organization and management of three workshops on climate change related issues.
The centre also contributes to knowledge dissemination through specific events (seminars, conferences, congresses or workshops) and educational activities, with the preparation, funding and management of training programs (on a post-doctoral level), such as PhD Schools and Summer and Winter schools.

Research units
The activities of the CMCC are carried out by and clustered into eight different topical Research units:

ODA Ocean modeling and Data Assimilation	
ECIP	Economic analysis of Climate Impacts and Policy Division 
OPA	Ocean Predictions and Applications
IAFES	Impacts on Agriculture, Forests, and Natural Ecosystems 
REMHI	Regional Models and geo-Hydrological Impacts
ASC Advanced Scientific Computing 
CSP Climate Simulation and Prediction Division
SEME Sustainable Earth Modelling Economics

Furthermore, CMCC also hosts the working group of the IPCC National Focal Point for Italy.

External links

Foresight
RFF-CMCC European Institute on Economics and the Environment (EIEE).

Climate change organizations
Research institutes in Italy